Beit Kahil is a Palestinian village in the Hebron Governorate in the southern West Bank,   located seven kilometers northwest of Hebron.

History
Victor Guérin noted that the place was apparently  ancient, and suggested that Beit Kahil was to be recognized with the Latin Cela (Greek: Κηλά), described by Eusebius in his Onomasticon, rather than with the Biblical  Keilah (Greek: Κεειλά), which was already a ruin in Guérin's time.

Ottoman era

In 1863  Victor Guérin  found that it had thirty houses, while an Ottoman  village list from about 1870 counted 8  houses and a population of 22, though  the population count included men only.

In 1883  the PEF's Survey of Western Palestine (SWP)  described  Beit Kahel as  “a small village on a ridge, built of stone, with a well to the south. Apparently an ancient place, with rock-cut tombs.”

British Mandate era
In the 1922 census of Palestine, conducted by the British Mandate authorities, Beit Kahil had a population of 336 inhabitants, all Muslims, increasing in the 1931 census to 452, still entirely Muslim, in 90 inhabited houses. In the latter census it was counted with Kh. Beit Kanun,  Kh. Hawala and Kh. Tawas.

In the 1945 statistics the population of Beit Kahil  was   570 Muslims,  and the total land area was 5,795  dunams of land according to an official land and population survey.  Of this, 1,359 dunams were plantations and irrigable land, 1,785  were for cereals, while 26 dunams were built-up (urban) land.

1948-1967
In the wake of the 1948 Arab–Israeli War, and after the 1949 Armistice Agreements, Beit Kahil came  under Jordanian rule.

The Jordanian census of 1961 found 704 inhabitants in Beit Kahil.

Post-1967
Since the Six-Day War in 1967, Beit Kahil has been under Israeli occupation. Since 1995, it has been governed by the Palestinian National Authority (PNA) as part of Area B of the West Bank.

According to the Palestinian Central Bureau of Statistics, Beit Kahil had a population of approximately 6,526 inhabitants in 2007. The population is made up of several clans, including al-Attawna, al-Assafra, al-Zuhoor, al-Judi, Barham and al-Khateeb. The village's total land area is 5,795 dunams.

Detention of residents
In August, 2019, Israeli authorities detained two individuals from Beit Kahil who were accused in the murder of Dvir Sorek; a 19-year-old Israeli settler. In October the detainees were indicted, and in November the IDF demolished the homes of the families of the two detainees, alongside those of two others charged in connection with the murder, in Beit Kahil. The criminal case was resolved two and a half years later, in May 2022, when all four men, together with a fifth, were convicted by military court.

In September, 2019, the deputy mayor and his son in addition to two other people from Beit Kahil were detained in mass arrest over the West Bank.

References

Bibliography

External links
Welcome To Bayt Kahil
Beit Kahil, Welcome to Palestine
Survey of Western Palestine, Map 21:    IAA, Wikimedia commons
Beit Kahil Village (Fact Sheet),  Applied Research Institute–Jerusalem (ARIJ)
 Beit Kahil Village Profile, ARIJ
  Beit Kahil Village Area Photo, ARIJ
 The priorities and needs for development in Beit Kahil village based on the community and local authorities’ assessment, ARIJ

Villages in the West Bank
Municipalities of the State of Palestine